The South African national cricket team toured Australia in December 2022 and January 2023 to play three Test matches. The Test matches formed part of the 2021–2023 ICC World Test Championship.

In May 2022, Cricket Australia confirmed the fixtures for the tour, with  three-match ODI series was scheduled to be played just after the test series. However, in July 2022, South Africa withdrew from the ODI series, after the fixtures clashed with their new domestic T20 league. The ODI series would have formed part of the inaugural 2020–2023 ICC Cricket World Cup Super League. The Super League points for the three matches were awarded to Australia, subject to approval by ICC. Later, the matches were scratched with the points being awarded to Australia.

The Gabba was sanctioned by the ICC, receiving a "below average" rating and one demerit point from match referee Richie Richardson, after the first Test was over within two days.

Squads

On 22 November 2022, Glenton Stuurman was ruled out of South Africa's Test team due to a injury and was replaced by Lizaad Williams After the first Test, Josh Hazlewood replaced Michael Neser in Australia's squad. After the second test, Ashton Agar and Matt Renshaw replaced Cameron Green and Mitchell Starc as injury replacements. South Africa's Theunis de Bruyn was ruled out of third Test, since he returned home for the birth of his first child.

Warm-up match

Test series

1st Test

2nd Test

3rd Test

ODI series
South Africa forfeited all three scheduled ODIs in July 2022 in order to accommodate their T20 league tournament, the SA20.

1st ODI

2nd ODI

3rd ODI

Notes

References

External links
 Series home at ESPNcricinfo

2022 in Australian cricket
2022 in South African cricket
2023 in Australian cricket
2023 in South African cricket
International cricket competitions in 2022–23
2022-23